Brienne Stairs (born 22 December 1989) is a Canadian women's field hockey player.

Stairs first represented Canada in 2011, and has become a mainstay in the national team since. She has competed at two Pan American Games and two Pan American Cup's taking home a bronze medal from each.

Following the 2017 Pan American Cup, Stairs was named in the 2017 Pan American Elite Team by the Pan American Hockey Federation.

References

External links
 
 
 
 Brienne Stairs at the Lima 2019 Pan American Games

1989 births
Living people
Canadian female field hockey players
Field hockey people from Ontario
Sportspeople from Kitchener, Ontario
KHC Leuven players
Commonwealth Games competitors for Canada
Field hockey players at the 2018 Commonwealth Games
Pan American Games medalists in field hockey
Pan American Games bronze medalists for Canada
Pan American Games silver medalists for Canada
Field hockey players at the 2015 Pan American Games
Field hockey players at the 2019 Pan American Games
Medalists at the 2015 Pan American Games
Medalists at the 2019 Pan American Games
Field hockey players at the 2022 Commonwealth Games
20th-century Canadian women
21st-century Canadian women